The Colorado Classic was a golf tournament on the Nationwide Tour. It ran from 1996 to 1997. It was played at Riverdale Golf Course in Brighton, Colorado.

In 1997 the winner earned $36,000.

Winners

Former Korn Ferry Tour events
Golf in Colorado
Recurring sporting events established in 1996
Recurring sporting events disestablished in 1997